The 2013–14 Los Angeles Kings season was the 47th season (46th season of play) for the National Hockey League (NHL) franchise that was established on June 5, 1967. The team would advance to the 2014 Stanley Cup playoffs and eventually the 2014 Stanley Cup Finals, where they defeated the New York Rangers in five games to win their second Stanley Cup in franchise history.

Standings

Schedule and results

Pre-season

Regular season

Playoffs

The Los Angeles Kings entered the playoffs as the Pacific Division's third seed. They faced the San Jose Sharks in the first round. The Kings became only the fourth team in NHL history to win a series when trailing 3–0 in the series with their Game 7 win over the Sharks in the Western Conference First Round.  They later became the first team to advance to the Stanley Cup finals having played 21 games. They also became the first team to win three Game 7s on the road. The Kings clinched their second Stanley Cup finals berth in three years, where they took on Eastern champions, the New York Rangers.

The Kings won the Stanley Cup in a double-overtime Game 5 victory. This was the team's second Stanley Cup championship in three years.

Legend:

Player statistics

Skaters
Note: GP = Games played; G = Goals; A = Assists; Pts = Points; +/− = Plus/minus; PIM = Penalty minutes
Final Stats

Goaltenders
Note: GP = Games played; GS = Games started; TOI = Time on ice; W = Wins; L = Losses; OT = Overtime losses; GA = Goals against; GAA = Goals against average; SV = Saves; SA = Shots against; SV% = Save percentage; SO = Shutouts; G = Goals; A = Assists; PIM = Penalty minutes
Final stats

†Denotes player spent time with another team before joining the Kings. Statistics reflect time with the Kings only.
‡Traded mid-season. Statistics reflect time with the Kings only.
Bold/italics denotes franchise record

Awards and records

Awards

Transactions 
The Kings have been involved in the following transactions during the 2013–14 season:

Trades

Free agents signed

Free agents lost

Claimed via waivers

Lost via waivers

Lost via retirement

Player signings

Draft picks

Los Angeles Kings' picks at the 2013 NHL Entry Draft, that was held in Newark, New Jersey on June 30, 2013.

Draft notes

 The Los Angeles Kings' first-round pick went to the Columbus Blue Jackets as the result of a February 23, 2012, trade that sent Jeff Carter to the Kings in exchange for Jack Johnson and this pick.
 The Edmonton Oilers' second-round pick went to the Los Angeles Kings as the result of a trade on June 30, 2013, that sent a second and third-round pick in 2013 (57th and 88th overall) and Carolina's fourth-round pick in 2013 (96th overall) to Edmonton in exchange for this pick.
 The Los Angeles Kings' second-round pick went to the St. Louis Blues (via Edmonton), Los Angeles traded this pick to the Edmonton Oilers as the result of a trade on June 30, 2013, that sent a second-round pick in 2013 (37th overall) to Los Angeles in exchange for a third-round pick in 2013 (88th overall), Carolina's fourth-round pick in 2013 (96th overall) and this pick.
 The Los Angeles Kings' third-round pick went to the Edmonton Oilers as the result of a trade on June 30, 2013, that sent a second-round pick in 2013 (37th overall) to Los Angeles in exchange for a second-round pick in 2013 (57th overall), Carolina's fourth-round pick in 2013 (96th overall) and this pick.
 The Phoenix Coyotes' fourth-round pick went to the Los Angeles Kings (via Columbus and Philadelphia) as a result of a February 26, 2013, trade that sent Simon Gagne to the Flyers in exchange for this pick.
 The Montreal Canadiens' fifth-round pick went to the Los Angeles Kings as a result of an April 2, 2013, trade that sent Davis Drewiske to the Canadiens in exchange for this pick.
 The Dallas Stars' seventh-round pick went to the Los Angeles Kings as a result of a June 23, 2012, trade that sent Edmonton's 2012 seventh-round pick to the Stars in exchange for this pick.
 The Los Angeles Kings' seventh-round pick went to the New Jersey Devils as the result of a trade on June 30, 2013, that sent a seventh-round pick in 2015 to Los Angeles in exchange for this pick.

References

Los Angeles Kings seasons
Los Angeles Kings season, 2013-14
Los
Western Conference (NHL) championship seasons
Los
Stanley Cup championship seasons
LA Kings
LA Kings